György Bokor (25 November 1928 – 15 June 2014) was a Hungarian basketball player. He competed in the men's tournament at the 1952 Summer Olympics.

References

1928 births
2014 deaths
Hungarian men's basketball players
Olympic basketball players of Hungary
Basketball players at the 1952 Summer Olympics
Basketball players from Budapest